Kampong Berangan is a neighbourhood in Bandar Seri Begawan, the capital of Brunei. It is also a village in Brunei-Muara District, within Mukim Kianggeh. The population was 379 in 2016. It has the postcode BA1111.

References 

Villages in Brunei-Muara District
Neighbourhoods in Bandar Seri Begawan